In pathology, hypertrophic decidual vasculopathy, abbreviated HDV, is the histomorphologic correlate of gestational hypertension, as may be seen in intrauterine growth restriction (IUGR) and HELLP syndrome.  

The name of the condition describes its appearance under the microscope; the smooth muscle of the decidual (or maternal) blood vessels is hypertrophic, i.e. the muscle part of the blood vessels feeding the placenta is larger due to cellular enlargement.

Morphologic features
The morphologic features of mild and moderate HDV include:
Perivascular inflammatory cells,
+/-Vascular thrombosis,
Smooth muscle hypertrophy, and
Endothelial hyperplasia.
Severe HDV is characterized by:
Atherosis - foamy macrophages within vascular wall, and
Fibrinoid necrosis of vessel wall (amorphous eosinophilic vessel wall).

See also
Fetal thrombotic vasculopathy
Gestational diabetes
Placenta
Pregnancy

References

Pathology
Health issues in pregnancy